Porphyrellus porphyrosporus, commonly known as the dusky bolete, is a rare fungus belonging to the family Boletaceae. With its purple-brown cap and stem, P. porphyrosporus is not easy to spot, despite its large size. This summer and autumn species occurs under pines, but can also be found beneath deciduous trees. It is a large (both cap diameter and stem length up to 15 cm) brown bolete. Its most distinctive features are the purple-brown spore print and the blue-green colour of the flesh at the top of the stem and above the hymenium.

This is a widespread species of Europe, especially in the north, but is nowhere particularly common. The fruit bodies appear from late summer to autumn, often in small groups, associated with broad-leaved trees such as beech and oak.

Description
This mushroom has a dark brown cap, usually with a paler margin. Initially convex, caps expand and sometimes become irregularly lobed. The tubes are similar in colour to the cap, and when cut or bruised, turn blue-green.
The mushroom has an unpleasant sour taste and odour. One guide lists the species as edible, while another considers it "probably edible".

Tylopilus indecisus is a similar species.

References

Further reading 
 Mushrooms and Toadstools of Britain and Europe, Stefan Buczacki (HarperCollins, 1992)

External links

 Picture and description (in German) at Natur-Lexikon.com

Boletaceae
Edible fungi
Fungi of Europe
Fungi of North America
Fungi described in 1835
Taxa named by Elias Magnus Fries